Zimbabwe National Statistics Agency (ZIMSTAT) is the statistics agency of Zimbabwe. It is headquartered  in the Kaguvi Building in Harare.

Census and Statistics Act of 2007 created the agency. It replaced the Central Statistical Office (CSO). It was headquartered in the Kaguvi Building in Harare.

References

External links
 Zimbabwe National Statistics Agency

Government of Zimbabwe
National statistical services
Government agencies established in 2007
2007 establishments in Zimbabwe